Denge Marsh , also spelled Dengemarsh and occasionally called the Denge, is a part of Romney Marsh in Kent. Its north-west boundary is the town of Lydd; to the south-east is Denge Beach and Dungeness.

History
In Roman times, the area which is now Romney Marsh was under water; Lympne and Appledore, now on the northern edge of Romney Marsh, were coastal ports. There were islands in the area, including Lydd. Denge Marsh, south-east of Lydd, was one of the earliest parts in the area to be reclaimed; this is recorded in a charter of A.D. 744. Reclamation of the adjacent area, the present-day Walland Marsh which is to the north-west of Lydd, continued through the Middle Ages. Drainage dykes, known locally as sewers, were built.

Sound mirrors
At the north-eastern edge of Denge Marsh, near Greatstone-on-Sea, are the sound mirrors at Denge: they are large concrete structures, built as an experiment between 1928 and 1930, by which sound could be focussed onto microphones, so giving an early warning of the approach of enemy aircraft. They soon became obsolete with the invention of radar.

References

Marshes of England
Landforms of Kent